Leon Live is a live album by singer and songwriter Leon Russell recorded on August 28, 1972, at the Long Beach Arena in Long Beach, California. It was Russell's first live album and was originally released as a three-LP set in a tri-fold cover on Russell's Shelter Records label. The album was mixed at Ardent Studios and distributed by Capitol Records. The album peaked at No. 9 on the Billboard Top LPs chart and received a gold certification for sales of over 500,000 albums. Leon Live was re-released on CD by The Right Stuff Records in 1996. The album has gold certification for sales of over 500,000 albums in the US and Canada

In November 1972, Billboard cited Russell as a top concert draw and reported the 1972 tour gross at almost $3 million.

Track listing
All songs performed by Leon Russell.
All tracks composed by Leon Russell except where indicated. 

Side 1
 "Mighty Quinn Medley: I'll Take You There/Idol with the Golden Head/I Serve a Living Savior/Mighty Quinn" (Al Bell/Jerry Leiber, Mike Stoller/Betty Watson/Bob Dylan) - 11:44
 "Shoot Out on the Plantation" - 4:52
 "Dixie Lullaby" (Leon Russell, Chris Stainton) - 3:10
Side 2
 "Queen of the Roller Derby"   - 1:53
 "Roll Away the Stone" (Greg Dempsey, Leon Russell) - 3:56
 "It's Been a Long Time Baby"  (John Lee Hooker, Jules Taub) - 3:24
 "Great Day" (Traditional)   -	3:04
 "Alcatraz"   - 	4:23
Side 3
 "Crystal Closet Queen"   - 6:33
 "Prince of Peace' (Greg Dempsey, Leon Russell) - 4:27
 "Sweet Emily"    - 3:09
 "Stranger in a Strange Land" (Don Preston, Leon Russell) - 5:01
Side 4
 "Out in the Woods"   - 9:13
 "Some Day"  (Traditional) - 3:21
 "Sweeping Through the City" (Shirley Caesar) - 	2:32
Side 5
 "Medley: Jumpin' Jack Flash/Young Blood" (Mick Jagger, Keith Richards, Jerry Leiber, Mike Stoller, Doc Pomus) - 16:15
Side 6
 "Of Thee I Sing/Yes I Am: Medley" (Don Preston, Leon Russell) - 10:25
 "Delta Lady"  - 3:57
 "It's All Over Now, Baby Blue"  (Bob Dylan) -	6:44

Charts

Personnel
Leon Russell - bass, guitar, keyboards, piano, vocals
Chuck Blackwell - drums
Ambrose Campbell - congas, drums, percussion
Joey Cooper - guitar, vocals, backing vocals
Nawasa Crowder - backing vocals
John Gallie - keyboards, organ
Rev. Patrick Henderson - arranger, keyboards, percussion, piano, vocals, backing vocals
Phyllis Lindsey - vocals
Don Preston - guitar, vocals, backing vocals
Carl Radle - bass

John LeMay - Mixing
John Fry - Mixing
Ellis Widner - Liner Notes
Ed Caraeff	- Photography
Tom Cartwright - Reissue Producer
Jason Arnold - Mastering
Denny Cordell - Producer

References

External links
Leon Live, live at the Long Beach Arena, Long Beach, California on August 28th, 1972.

Leon Russell discography
Leon Russell lyrics
Leon Russell Records
Leon Russell NAMM Oral History Program Interview (2012)

1973 live albums
Leon Russell albums
Shelter Records albums
Albums produced by Leon Russell